The Fan is a 1977 American epistolary thriller novel by Bob Randall. Its plot follows a famous actress who is pursued by a maniac male fan with dangerous impulses. It was published in 1977 by Random House. It was adapted into the 1981 feature film of the same name starring Lauren Bacall and Michael Biehn.

Style
The novel is written in epistolary form, presented as a series of diary entries and letter correspondence between the main characters, Sally Ross, an aging but glamorous actress, and Douglas, an obsessive young fan.

References

1977 American novels
American thriller novels
American novels adapted into films
Epistolary novels
Novels set in New York City
Works about stalking